Raudhamran is a mountain in Lom Municipality in Innlandet county, Norway. The mountain is surrounded by several other notable mountains including Surtningssue to the northeast; Blåbreahøe to the north; Memurutindene to the northwest; Reinstinden, Hinnotefjellet, and Storådalshøe to the west; and Knutsholstinden to the south.

See also
List of mountains of Norway by height

References

Jotunheimen
Lom, Norway
Mountains of Innlandet